Rudi Peters (born January 30, 1939 - November 30, 2002) was a Canadian politician who served in the Legislative Assembly of Saskatchewan from 1995 to 1999, as a Saskatchewan Party member for the constituency of Battleford-Cut Knife.

Near the end of his first term as a member of the Saskatchewan Legislative Assembly, Peters died at the age of 63, succumbing to cancer.

References

Saskatchewan Party MLAs
1939 births
2002 deaths
21st-century Canadian politicians